Wilbur Mitcham (December 10, 1923 - June 15, 2003) was an American chef.

Early life
Mitcham briefly served in the U.S. Army as a field artilleryman during World War II but was medically discharged due to health reasons. Upon his discharge from the Army he went to New York City. In New York, he studied cooking under an Asian chef.

Career
Mitcham returned to Macon and landed a position as a short order cook with Len Berg's Restaurant in 1943.  "Chef", as he was so affectionately known by his constituents and friends, served as the senior chef cook of Len Berg's Restaurant for over 60 years until he took ill.  He cooked for Ben Hogan,  Sam Snead and Joe Dimaggio.

Personal life
Mitcham was married for over 60 years to Annie Mae Leonard. He died on Father's Day 2003.

Mitcham is featured in the book “Remembering Len Berg's Restaurant”.  He Fathered and raised 13 children. He was the father of Samaria (Mitcham) Bailey and “The Gay Preacher’s Wife” author Lydia Meredith and is featured in her book.

Further reading
 Campbell, Will D. (1995). The Stem of Jesse: The Costs of Community at a 1960s Southern School. Macon, Ga.: Mercer University Press. pp. ix, 212 pp 110–111; 24 cm.. . Miller, p. 111.

References

External links
 Wilbur Mitcham from the Georgia Encyclopedia
Mercer University Press

1923 births
2003 deaths
African-American chefs
American male chefs
American chefs
Chefs from Georgia (U.S. state)
United States Army personnel of World War II
People from Macon County, Georgia
20th-century African-American people
21st-century African-American people